Plays Well with Others is a studio album by American guitarist Greg Koch. Released in 2013. Several accomplished and well known musicians performed on this album with Greg Koch.

Release and reception 
This album including guitarists: Joe Bonamassa Robben Ford, Paul Barrère. Roscoe Beck was featured on bass and Jon Cleary on piano.

The album was released in 2013.

Track listing

Personnel 
Greg Koch
Acoustic Guitar, Vocals – John Sieger
Bass – Eric Hervey, Roscoe Beck (tracks: 2,5,6)
Drums – Brannen Temple (tracks: 2,5,6), Dylan Koch
Electric Guitar – Joe Bonamassa (tracks: 1), Paul Barreré* (tracks: 4,7,9,10), Robben Ford (tracks: 2,5,6)
Electric Guitar, Slide Guitar – Greg Koch
Organ, Electric Piano – Theo Merriweather
Piano – Jon Cleary (tracks: 3)

References 

2013 albums
Blues albums by American artists